Dr George Stuart Carter FRSE  FLS FZS (1893-1969) was a leading British zoologist and zoological author.

Life

He was born on 15 September 1893, the son of Rev G C Carter and Hilda E Keane.

He studied at Marlborough College and then was awarded a place at Cambridge University, where he continued also at postgraduate level, gaining a PhD in Zoology. His studies were interrupted by the First World War: he served in the 6th Leicestershire Regiment from 1914-1917 and then as a Sound Ranger in the Royal Engineers 1917 to 1919.

After the war he obtained a post at the Stazione Zoologica in Naples where he worked 1922 to 1923 before receiving a post as a lecturer in Zoology at Glasgow University. He stayed at Glasgow until 1930, then receiving a Fellowship from Corpus Christi College, Cambridge, lecturing there from 1938 until retiral in 1960 .

He was elected a Fellow of the Royal Society of Edinburgh in 1925.
He died in Cambridge on 2 December 1969.

Publications
A General Zoology of the Invertebrates (1940)
Animal Evolution (1951)
The Papyrus Swamps of Uganda (1955)
A Hundred Year of Evolution (1957)
Structure and Habitat in Vertebrate Evolution (1967)

References

1893 births
1969 deaths
Fellows of the Royal Society of Edinburgh
Alumni of the University of Cambridge
Academics of the University of Cambridge
20th-century British zoologists